The Kanotex Refining Company (reporting mark: KOTX), a regional oil refinery and gasoline distributor, began operation in Caney, Kansas in 1909, a successor to the Superior Refining Company. The company's logo was a Kansas sunflower behind a five-point star; the Kan-O-Tex name referred to Kansas, Oklahoma and Texas as the states in which the company originally marketed its products.

History
John McEwen Ames became the company's president in 1915 and established a main refinery in Arkansas City, Kansas in 1917 which would become the base of the company's operations. While the initial market was Kansas, Oklahoma and Texas, Meyer Brothers Gas Station & General Store in Orchard Farm, Missouri sold Kan-O-Tex fuel in the late 1920s; by 1930, Kan-O-Tex products were advertised locally in St. Joseph, Missouri by the Home Oil and Gas Corporation, a chain of nineteen filling stations. 

The Kan-O-Tex brand and reporting mark were acquired by the now-defunct Anderson-Prichard Oil Corporation of Oklahoma City, Oklahoma in October 1953 and are no longer in use. 

One Kan-O-Tex Service Station, the former Little's Service Station on U.S. Route 66 in Galena, Kansas, was restored in 2007 as a diner and souvenir shop as part of wider efforts to rebuild and market the historic U.S. Route 66 as a tourism destination.

References

Defunct oil companies of the United States
Defunct companies based in Kansas
Energy companies established in 1909
Energy companies disestablished in 1953
Non-renewable resource companies established in 1909
1953 mergers and acquisitions
1909 establishments in Kansas
1953 disestablishments in Kansas
American companies established in 1909
American companies disestablished in 1953